One Sexy Zone (stylized as one Sexy Zone) is the debut studio album by Japanese idol group Sexy Zone. It was released on November 14, 2012, through Pony Canyon. The record was preceded by three singles: "Sexy Zone", "Lady Diamond", and "Sexy Summer ni Yuki ga Furu".

One Sexy Zone was released in four editions: Regular Edition, Limited Edition, Lawson-HMV Limited Edition, and Sexy Zone Shop Limited Edition. It ranked number one on the Oricon Singles Chart, where the quintet set the record for the youngest male group to top the chart with an average age of 15.4 years. The album also charted at number three on the Billboard Japan Top Album Sales chart. It was certified gold by the Recording Industry Association of Japan (RIAJ), denoting shipments of 100,000 units.

Release and promotion
One Sexy Zone was released on November 14, 2012, in four editions: Regular Edition; Limited Edition with bonus DVD content that includes a special video of Sexy Zone in Las Vegas; Lawson-HMV Limited Edition with bonus DVD content that includes behind-the-scenes of the album jacket photoshoot and the music videos for the previously released singles "Sexy Zone", "Lady Diamond", and "Sexy Summer ni Yuki ga Furu"; and Sexy Zone Shop Limited Edition.
Sexy Zone embarked on the New Year Arena Concert 2013 on January 2 and 3 at Osaka-jō Hall and January 4 to 6 at the Yokohama Arena.

Commercial performance
On the issue dated November 26, 2012, One Sexy Zone debuted at number one on Japan's national weekly Oricon Albums Chart, selling 86,451 copies in its first week. With an average age of 15.4 years, Sexy Zone became the youngest male group to top the chart. The record was previously held by w-inds. when its album w-inds.: 1st Message (2001) ranked number one 10 years and 11 months prior; the average age of the group was 16.3 years. On the Billboard Japan Top Album chart, the album debuted at number three.

One Sexy Zone was certified gold at the end of the month by the Recording Industry Association of Japan for shipments exceeding 100,000 units. According to Oricon's year-end report, the album sold 95,421 copies domestically and ranked number 71 on its list of best-selling albums. It also ranked at number 91 on the Billboard Japan Top Albums Sales Year End chart.

Track listing

Charts

Weekly

Year-end

References

2012 debut albums
Pony Canyon albums
Sexy Zone albums